This is a list of cult films organized alphabetically by name. See List of cult films for main list.

References

Cult